"Forgiving You Was Easy" is a song written and recorded by American country music artist Willie Nelson.  It was released in February 1985 as the first single from the album Me & Paul.  The song was Nelson's tenth number one single as a solo artist.  The single went to number one for one week and spent fourteen weeks on the country chart.

Charts

Weekly charts

Year-end charts

References

1985 songs
Willie Nelson songs
1985 singles
Songs written by Willie Nelson
Columbia Records singles